Hintere Schwärze is a mountain on the border between Austria and Italy. At , it is the fourth highest peak in the Ötztal Alps.

References

Mountains of Tyrol (state)
Mountains of South Tyrol
Mountains of the Alps
Alpine three-thousanders
Ötztal Alps
Austria–Italy border
International mountains of Europe